Il trionfo di Clelia ("The Triumph of Clelia") is an 18th-century Italian opera in three acts by the Czech composer Josef Mysliveček composed to a libretto by the Italian poet Metastasio. It was common in the 1760s for composers to set Metastasian texts written decades before. Exceptionally, the text for Il trionfo di Clelia, first produced in Vienna in 1762, was almost new when Mysliveček was commissioned to compose his setting for Turin, and all of the aria texts used for his setting derive from the original libretto. This opera (and all the rest of Mysliveček's operas) belong to the serious type in Italian language referred to as opera seria.

Metastasio's libretto was also set by Gluck and others.

Performance history
The opera was first performed at the Teatro Regio in Turin on 26 December 1767 at the beginning of the 1768 carnival operatic season. Opera productions at the royal court of Turin, which were sponsored only for the carnival season that took place at the beginning of each year, were famed for their lavish staging.  Mysliveček's commission was the first after his overwhelming successes in Naples in the year 1767, particularly with Il Bellerofonte.  He soon was given commissions from every major operatic center in Italy.  The cast of the Turin production of Il trionfo di Clelia included the noted soprano Caterina Gabrielli, who had contributed enormously to the success of Il Bellerofonte in Naples. Francesca Gabrielli, probably her sister, also appeared in the Turin production along with the aging castrato Sebastiano Emiliani.  Mysliveček's opera Il trionfo di Clelia was never performed in Prague, but he clearly brought the music with him when he returned to Prague for a visit early in 1768, since arias from it were copied into ecclesiastical collections in Bohemia for decades after the 1760s.  The same phenomenon is noticeable for arias from the operas Semiramide and Il Bellerofonte, works that were revived in Prague after the composer's return in 1768.

Roles

Vocal numbers
Act 1
Scene 2 – Aria of Tarquinio, "Sì, tacerò, se vuoi"
Scene 3 – Aria of Larissa, "Ah, celar la bella face"
Scene 5 – Aria of Orazio, "Resta, o cara"
Scene 7 – Aria of Clelia, "Mille dubbi me destano in petto"
Scene 8 – Aria of Porsenna, "Sai che piegar si vede"
Scene 10 – Accompanied recitative for Orazio, "Che crudel sacrifizio"
Scene 10 – Aria of Orazio, "Saper ti basti, o cara"
Scene 11 – Aria of Clelia, "Tempeste il mar"
Act 2
Scene 1 – Accompanied recitative of Tarquinio, "Dei, scorre l'ora"
Scene 1 – Aria of Orazio, "Dei di Roma"
Scene 3 – Duet for Clelia and Orazio, "Sì, ti fido al tuo gran core"
Scene 5 – Aria of Porsenna, "Sol del Tebro"
Scene 8 – Aria of Larissa, "Dico che ingiusto sei"
Scene 9 – Aria of Mannio, "Vorrei che almen per gioco"
Scene 13 – Aria of Clelia, "Io nemica, a torto il dici"
Scene 14 – Accompanied recitative for Tarquinio, "Ma quel mai sì possente"
Scene 14 – Aria of Tarquinio, "Non speri onusto il pino"
Act 3
Scene 1 – Aria of Clelia, "Tanto esposta alle sventure"
Scene 3 – Aria of Larissa, "Ah, ritorna età del oro"
Scene 5 – Aria of Porsenna, "Spesso, se ben l'affretta"
Scene 6 – Aria of Tarquinio, "In questa selva oscura"
Scene 8 – Aria of Orazio, "De' folgori di Giove"
Scene 10 – Chorus, "Oggi a te, gran re toscano"

References

Italian-language operas
Operas by Josef Mysliveček
1767 operas
Opera seria
Opera world premieres at the Teatro Regio (Turin)
Operas
Cultural depictions of Lucius Tarquinius Superbus
Cultural depictions of Cloelia